The 1982 Avon Championships of Chicago  was a women's tennis tournament played on indoor carpet courts at the Rosemont Horizon in Chicago, Illinois in the United States that was part of the 1982 Avon Championships Circuit. It was the 11th edition of the tournament and was held from January 25 through January 31, 1982. First-seeded Martina Navratilova won the singles title and earned $30,000 first-prize money.

Finals

Singles
 Martina Navratilova defeated  Wendy Turnbull 6–4, 6–1
 It was Navratilova's 3rd singles title of the year and the 58th of her career.

Doubles
 Martina Navratilova /  Pam Shriver defeated  Rosie Casals /  Wendy Turnbull 7–5, 6–4

Prize money

References

External links
 International Tennis Federation (ITF) tournament edition details
 Tournament draws

Avon Championships of Chicago
Avon Championships of Chicago
Avon Championships of Chicago
Avon Championships of Chicago
1980s in Chicago
Avon Championships of Chicago